Usman Peerzada is a Pakistani actor, director and producer. 

He has acted in many Punjabi and Urdu films and serials. 

His work includes Beyond the Last Mountain and Kahi Un Kahi.

Early life 
Usman was born in Lahore in 1955 into a Punjabi Muslim family involved in the performing arts: His father Rafi Peerzada (1898-1974) was an actor and a playwright who pioneered theatre in Pakistan, his legacy in theatre being continued by Usman's brother Saadaan Peerzada, his other brothers Salmaan Peerzada and Imran Peerzada are both active in cinema and on television as actors and filmmakers, his sister Tasneem Peerzada is a Urdu journalist specialized in culture, while yet another brother, Faizaan Peerzada (1958-2012), was an artist and a puppeteer.

He studied in St. Anthony's High School and then graduated in MA English in 1974 from Government College University (GCU).

Career 
He started his career from his college in 1974 in different plays and dramatic festivals. And then, in 1976, he got an offer for the lead role in a Pakistani English language film Beyond the Last Mountain.

Personal life 
Peerzada married actress and director Samina Peerzada in 1975. 

They have two children Anum and Amal Peerzada, Amal being a miniature artist.

Filmography

Television series

Telefilm

Film

Awards and nominations

References

External links 
 
 

1955 births
20th-century Pakistani male actors
Living people
People from Lahore
Pakistani male film actors
Pakistani film directors
21st-century Pakistani male actors
Pakistani film producers
Male actors in Punjabi cinema
Pakistani screenwriters
Male actors from Lahore
Pakistani male television actors
Male actors in Urdu cinema
Government College University, Lahore alumni
Punjabi people
St. Anthony's High School, Lahore alumni